The UFAW Handbook is a manual about care of animals used in animal testing. It is presented by the Universities Federation for Animal Welfare.

Reviews
Editions of the text have been reviewed in 1948, 1968, 1978, and more.

References

External links
Wiley's own sales page

Animal testing techniques
Medical manuals
1948 non-fiction books